Lee–Jackson Day was a state holiday in the U.S. Commonwealth of Virginia, commemorating Confederate commanders, Robert E. Lee and Stonewall Jackson.  Its observation was eliminated in 2020, replaced by Election Day as a state holiday.

Origin and name changes
The original holiday created in 1889 celebrated Lee's birthday (January 19) until 1904, which brought the addition of Jackson's name and birthday (January 21).

In 1983, the holiday was merged with the then-new federal holiday Martin Luther King, Jr. Day, as Lee–Jackson–King Day in Virginia; the merger was reversed in 2000.

Observation
Lee–Jackson Day was observed on the Friday immediately preceding Martin Luther King, Jr. Day (the third Monday in January).  Typical events included a wreath-laying ceremony with military honors, a Civil War themed parade, symposia, and a gala ball.   State offices were closed for both holidays.

During the 2010s, various Virginia municipalities chose not to observe Lee–Jackson Day, including Charlottesville, Fairfax, Fredericksburg, Hampton, Newport News, Richmond, and Winchester. In 2017, the Town of Blacksburg decided to stop observing the day as well.

Elimination
In early 2020 the newly elected Democratic Virginia General Assembly proposed ending the observance and designating Election Day as a replacement holiday.  The Senate of Virginia voted in January to eliminate Lee–Jackson Day as a state holiday; the legislation was passed a month later by the House of Delegates.  Governor Ralph Northam approved the bill in March, to take effect in July.

See also
 Confederate History Month
 Southern United States
 Robert E. Lee Day

References

1889 establishments in Virginia
Annual events in the United States
Friday observances
Holidays and observances by scheduling (nth weekday of the month)
Holidays related to the American Civil War
Monuments and memorials to Robert E. Lee
January observances
Recurring events established in 1889
Stonewall Jackson
Virginia culture
Birthdays